J. Basil Dannebohm (Jeremy Wayne Dannebohm) is a former Republican member of the Kansas House of Representatives, representing District 113. He was the only non-incumbent to run unopposed during the 2014 election.

In September 2012, Dannebohm claimed a diagnosis of young-onset Parkinson's disease.

On February 24, 2015, after serving only 42 days as a legislator, Dannebohm resigned citing health reasons. He was replaced by Greg Lewis of St. John.

Dannebohm was arrested in Salina, Kansas on June 5, 2019, for "Mistreat dependent adult/elder; Decept $25K-<$100K". Dannebohm's first court appearance was June 6, 2019, with a preliminary hearing scheduled July 23, 2019.

Committee assignments 
Representative Dannebohm served on these legislative committees;
 House Standing Committee on Commerce, Labor and Economic Development
 House Standing Committee on Agriculture and Natural Resources
 Vision 2020

References

External links 
 

Living people
1981 births
Republican Party members of the Kansas House of Representatives